Castlevania: Dracula X is a 1995 platform game developed and published by Konami for the Super Nintendo Entertainment System. It is the second and final Castlevania installment to be released for the Super NES. It shares the gameplay and storyline of Castlevania: Rondo of Blood, which was previously released exclusively in Japan on the PC Engine Super CD-ROM2 in 1993. While the plot is similar to Rondo of Blood and it uses many of that game's graphics, it features all-new levels and altered gameplay elements, rather than being a direct port because of the limits of the Super NES cartridge format and exclusivity agreements with PC Engine maker NEC. It was released on July 21, 1995, in Japan, in September 1995 in the US, February 22, 1996, in Europe, and on June 22, 1996, in Australia.

The game was re-released as a Wii U Virtual Console download in Japan on April 23, 2014, in North America on October 2, 2014, and the PAL regions on November 13, 2014. It was released again for New Nintendo 3DS Virtual Console download in North America on December 29, 2016, and in Europe and Australia on January 26, 2017. The game was also re-released as a part of the Castlevania Advance Collection on September 23, 2021, for the Nintendo Switch, PlayStation 4, Xbox One and Windows.

Gameplay

The gameplay follows that of previous Castlevania games, and is near identical to that of Rondo of Blood. The Super NES release features branching paths through the levels, like the PC Engine game, but has fewer levels. Also, whereas Rondo has game saves and the ability to play as Maria Reinhardt after she is rescued, Dracula X uses passwords and does not feature any additional playable characters.

Plot
The setting: medieval Transylvania. One hundred years have passed since legendary hero Simon Belmont defeated the evil Count Dracula and sealed him away for what was supposed to be eternity (Making the game set in 1791). The people have long since forgotten about the horror of the undead, thus allowing a few depraved individuals to restore the Prince of Darkness to his former state; sleeping in his coffin by day and preying upon hapless victims by night.

Dracula now plans to get revenge on his old enemy through his descendants by locking Annet, the girlfriend of Belmont's great grandson, Richter, and her younger little sister, Maria, in his dark and gloomy castle.

Once aware of this, Richter takes his ancestor's sacred whip, passed down through the years from father to son, and sets out for Dracula's castle to rescue Annet and Maria, and to seal away the evil Count for good.

The dark priest and major antagonist of both Rondo of Blood and its direct sequel Symphony of the Night, Shaft, is completely absent from the game's story and is never made reference to.

Reception

Castlevania: Dracula X for the Super NES received mixed reviews, with most critics stating that it is an inferior conversion of the PC Engine game. On the release of the game, Famicom Tsūshin scored Dracula X a 24 out of 40, and Electronic Gaming Monthly scored it a 6.75 out of 10, saying it is a good game in its own terms but does not hold up to previous Castlevania games. GamePro criticized that the stage design fails to encourage re-exploring stages, the bosses are not challenging enough, and the graphics and gameplay are primitive: "no knockout Mode 7 stages, no rotating rooms (like in Castlevania IV). Your character is also very small. The play engine feels like it's right out of the 8-bit versions ..." A critic for Next Generation panned it, saying it retains the by-then outdated graphics and controls of the PC Engine game and would not appeal even to die-hard Castlevania fans. He summarized it as "eight levels of no-frills side-scrolling action ... without an original or interesting thought in its wolfsbane-stuffed head." In contrast, IGN's retrospective on the series referred to it as "still one of the best traditional Castlevania games", and that it "holds its own" in terms of graphics, including a brighter color palette and Mode 7 graphics, but suffered from weak A.I. and bad level layout. It received a ranking of 73.75% from GameRankings, based on four reviews. In 2018, Complex rated the game 82nd on their "The Best Super Nintendo Games of All Time".

Notes

References

External links

1995 video games
1990s horror video games
Dracula X
Single-player video games
Super Nintendo Entertainment System games
Super Nintendo Entertainment System-only games
Video games developed in Japan
Video games set in the 18th century
Virtual Console games for Nintendo 3DS